Vale da Lama is a closed halt on the Algarve line in the Lagoa municipality, Portugal. It opened on the 1st of February 1902.

References

Railway stations in Portugal
Railway stations opened in 1902